Tignieu-Jameyzieu is a commune in the Isère department in southeastern France.

Geography
The Bourbre forms part of the commune's western border.

Population

See also
Communes of the Isère department

References

Tignieujameyzieu
Isère communes articles needing translation from French Wikipedia